is a Japanese actress born in Saitama Prefecture, Japan. She has starred in many films, most notably in Tokusou Sentai Dekaranger as Succubus Hells/ Human Fatale Camille. She reprised her role in Tokusou Sentai Dekaranger vs. Abaranger for a brief appearance. She also starred in Kamen Rider Hibiki as Kasumi Tachibana. Gamō is an active amateur marathon competitor and triathlete, having competed both in the Tokyo Marathon and in Hawaii, Paris, and Australia. She completed the 2011 Lavaman Triathlon in Anaehoomalu Bay, Hawaii.

Filmography
2004
Tokusou Sentai Dekaranger (TV series) – Camille / Succubus Hells (Ep. 21–23)
 
2005
Gekijouban Kamen Rider Hibiki to 7-nin no senki
Kamen Rider Hibiki: Asumu Henshin! You can be an Oni, too!! (video short) – Kasumi Tachibana/Kazue
Tokusou Sentai Dekaranger vs. Abaranger (video short) – Succubus Hells / Camille
Kamen Rider Hibiki (TV series) – Kasumi Tachibana
 
2007
Hatachi no koibito (TV series) – Miki Takeuchi (Ep. 1, 4, 6–10)
Speed Master
H-code (TV series) – Rena Nishikido
Ultra Galaxy Mega Monster Battle  – Kate
 
2008
Shaolin Girl
Mayu Yamada – herself
Ultra Galaxy Mega Monster Battle: Never Ending Odyssey – Kate
 
2009
The Unbroken
High-Kick Girl
Hien – herself

2010
Sayonara Itsuka

References

External links
 

Japanese film actresses
1982 births
Living people
Former Stardust Promotion artists